Lewis-Capehart-Roseberry House, also known as "Roseberry," is a historic home located at Point Pleasant, Mason County, West Virginia.  It was built about 1820, and is a spacious two story, double-pile, brick residence with a gable roof in the Federal-style.  It features sandstone lintels and sills.

It was listed on the National Register of Historic Places in 1979.

References

Houses on the National Register of Historic Places in West Virginia
Federal architecture in West Virginia
Houses completed in 1820
Houses in Mason County, West Virginia
National Register of Historic Places in Mason County, West Virginia
Point Pleasant, West Virginia